The 2018–19 IUPUI Jaguars men's basketball team represented Indiana University – Purdue University Indianapolis during the 2018–19 NCAA Division I men's basketball season. The Jaguars, led by fifth-year head coach Jason Gardner, played their home games at Indiana Farmers Coliseum in Indianapolis, Indiana as second-year members of the Horizon League. They finished the season 16–17, 8–10 in Horizon League play to finish in a three-way tie for sixth place. They lost in the quarterfinals of the Horizon League tournament to Wright State. They were invited to the CollegeInsider.com Tournament where they lost in the first round to Marshall.

Previous season
The Jaguars finished the season 11–19, 8–10 in Horizon League play to finish in a tie for fifth place. They lost in the quarterfinals of the Horizon League tournament to Oakland.

The season marked the first season as members of the Horizon League as IUPUI replaced Valparaiso who left the Horizon League to join the Missouri Valley Conference.

Roster

Schedule and results

|-
!colspan=9 style="| Exhibition

|-
!colspan=9 style="| Non-conference regular season

|-
!colspan=9 style=| Horizon League regular season

|-
!colspan=9 style=| Horizon League tournament
|-

|-
!colspan=12 style=|CollegeInsider.com Postseason tournament
|-

|-

References

IUPUI Jaguars men's basketball seasons
IUPUI
IUPUI
IUPUI
Iupui